Henry Verney Lovett Darby  was an Irish politician.

Darby was born in County Offaly (then called King's County) and educated at Trinity College, Dublin.

Darby was High Sheriff of King's County from 1799 to 1800; and represented Kilkenny City during 1800.

References

Irish MPs 1798–1800
Members of the Parliament of Ireland (pre-1801) for County Kilkenny constituencies
18th-century Irish people
Alumni of Trinity College Dublin
High Sheriffs of King's County
People from County Offaly